4Kids Entertainment, and its predecessor company (Leisure Concepts) and successor company (4Licensing Corporation) along with their subsidiaries have licensed, developed, and distributed a wide variety of media products, ranging from video games and television programs to toy lines.

Former TV productions 
The following TV programs have ended or expired, but were handled by 4Kids Entertainment's 4Kids Productions subsidiary during their run on 4Kids TV and Toonzai, as well as other TV networks. All anime is in bold.

Other TV properties 
 Buck Rogers in the 25th Century TV Series (Rights owned by NBCUniversal)
 ThunderCats (Rights owned by Warner Bros.)

Non-television properties handled by 4Kids Entertainment (or worldwide licensed) 
 The American Kennel Club
 Artlist Collection: The Dog and Friends
 Cabbage Patch Kids
 The Cat Fanciers' Association
 Charlie Chan (Company owned the trademark)
 Jim Henson Designs
 Karito Kids
 The Kooky Klickers
 Max Adventures
 Monster Jam
 Pachanga
 Pajanimals
 WordWorld

Past non-television properties handled by the company (or worldwide licensed) 
 James Bond 007
 The Puttermans
 Polly Pocket
 Pillow people
 The Adventures of Pinocchio
 Santo Bugito
 Nintendo of America (Various characters, trademarks, and copyrights)
 Marvel Characters, Inc.(Europe only)
 The Shadow (licensed from Conde Nast)
 The Swan Princess (licensed from Nest Family Entertainment) 
 Star Wars (licensed from Lucasfilm)

References 

Lists of television series by network
4Kids Entertainment